A Bomb Was Stolen is a 1962 Romanian dialogue-free spy film directed by Ion Popescu-Gopo. It was entered into the 1962 Cannes Film Festival.

Plot
The film begins with a nuclear bomb test. One of the bombs is stolen by gangsters, who hide the bomb in a bag. Inept police pursue the gangsters, and the bag containing the bomb is lost, and recovered by a passerby who does not know what's in the bag. The passerby goes about his day with the bag, pursued by the gangsters who are in turn pursued by the police.

Reception
The international press praised this film. In the English press, A Bomb Was Stolen received the label “an exuberant comedy” (Eric Shorter, Daily Telegraph, 25 August 1962), "a subtle and frequently hilarious satire" (Satiră din România, Edinburgh Evening News, 30 August 1962), "a satirical fantasy" (Bomba, Daily Worker, 3 September 1962). The Soviet journalist I. Surkova, writing for Sovetskaya Kulture, considered the film “full of witty jokes.”

Cast
 Eugenia Balaure
 Haralambie Boroș
 Horia Căciulescu
 Puiu Călinescu
 Iurie Darie
 Cella Dima
 Florin Piersic
 Tudorel Popa
 Geo Saizescu
 Ovid Teodorescu
 Liliana Tomescu
 Jean Dănescu
 Ștefan Niculescu-Cadet
 Lak Popescu
 Draga Olteanu-Matei (as Draga Olteanu) 
 Ion Bondor
 Ion Atanasiu Atlas
 Emil Botta as Somerhot (as Emil Bota) 
 Nelly Sterian
 Dumitru Hitru
 Nicolae Motoc

Awards
In May 1962, the film participated at the International Film Festival in Cannes, being nominated for the official Palme d'Or Award.
 It got several awards: 
 Merit Diploma at the New Europe Film Festival in Edinburgh (1962)
 Third Prize at the International Film Festival in Thessaloniki (September 1962)
 The Special Prize of the Jury “Silver Olive” at the International Festival of the Comic and Humorous Comedy, Palazzo del Parco, Bordighera (1963)
 Honorary diploma at the Vienna Film Festival

References

External links

1961 films
1961 comedy films
1960s science fiction films
1960s Romanian-language films
Films without speech
Romanian black-and-white films
Films directed by Ion Popescu-Gopo
Cold War spy films
Films shot in Romania
Romanian fantasy films
Romanian comedy films
Romanian science fiction films